Live at the Bedford is a 2005 live DVD album by British Post Trip Hop band Second Person.

This is the band's first live DVD and contains songs from their debut album Chromatography. The performance was filmed at The Bedford, Balham London on 23 May 2005 but due to recording and writing commitments, it took nearly a year and a half for the DVD to be finished. Band members Julia Johnson, Mark Maclaine and Álvaro López play alongside guest musicians: DJ Shylock (turntables) and Mike Ausden (guitar/trumpet) and the live performance was directed by Susan Luciani (also Director of Dolls for which the band provided music). The DVD was edited by Pierangelo Pirak and Ben King, produced by Mark Maclaine (aka The Silence) and mixed by him and Ben Jones at The Silence Corporation studios, London.

Track listing 
"Demons Die" – 3:30 
"I Spy" – 4:12
"Too Cold To Snow" – 4:42
"Wreckage" – 3:16
"No Window" – 4:21
"Divine" – 4:09
"Senseless Sentences" – 4:20
"Demons In The Scenery" – 3:48

Bonus Tracks:
 "Grace" – 5:02
 "That's What I've Been Told" – 4:09 (video taken from "Snows in the House 2")

References
 Second Person at CDBaby.com
 BBC Radio 2 Interview (The Weekender with Matthew Wright - 3 November 2005)
 Future Music Magazine interview (November 2005)
 Double Barrel Film Productions (UK)

External links
 "Live at The Bedford" Preview (Too Cold to Snow) on Google Video
 DVD information on SecondPerson.net

Second Person (band) albums
2006 live albums
2006 video albums
Live video albums